German submarine U-599 was a Type VIIC U-boat of Nazi Germany's Kriegsmarine during World War II.

She was a member of four wolfpacks, carried out one patrol and sank no ships.

She was sunk northwest of the Azores by a British aircraft on 24 October 1942.

Design
German Type VIIC submarines were preceded by the shorter Type VIIB submarines. U-599 had a displacement of  when at the surface and  while submerged. She had two shafts and two  propellers.

U-599 was fitted with five  torpedo tubes (four fitted at the bow and one at the stern), fourteen torpedoes, one  SK C/35 naval gun, 220 rounds, and a  C/30 anti-aircraft gun. The boat had a complement of between forty-four and sixty.

Service history
The submarine was laid down on 27 January 1941 at Blohm & Voss, Hamburg as yard number 575, launched on 15 October and commissioned on 4 December under the command of Kapitänleutnant Wolfgang Breithaupt.

She served with the 8th U-boat Flotilla from 4 December 1941 for training and the 1st flotilla from 1 September 1942 for operations.

Patrol and loss
U-599 departed Kiel on 27 August 1942 and headed for the Atlantic Ocean. Her route took her through the gap between Iceland and the Faroe Islands. She then patrolled the area southeast of Greenland and east of Labrador.

She was sunk on 24 October northwest of the Azores by depth charges dropped by a British B-24 Liberator of No. 224 Squadron RAF.

Forty-four men died in U-599; there were no survivors.

Wolfpacks
U-599 took part in four wolfpacks, namely:
 Lohs (13 – 22 September 1942) 
 Blitz (22 – 26 September 1942) 
 Tiger (26 – 30 September 1942) 
 Wotan (5 – 19 October 1942)

References

Bibliography

External links

German Type VIIC submarines
U-boats commissioned in 1941
U-boats sunk in 1942
U-boats sunk by British aircraft
U-boats sunk by depth charges
World War II submarines of Germany
1941 ships
Ships built in Hamburg
Ships lost with all hands
World War II shipwrecks in the Atlantic Ocean
Maritime incidents in October 1942